Landsman Henry Brutsche (1846 – December 27, 1880) was a Union Navy sailor who fought in the American Civil War. Brutsche received the country's highest award for bravery during combat, the Medal of Honor, for his action aboard the USS Tacony at Plymouth, North Carolina, on 31 October 1864. He was honored with the award on 31 December 1864.

Biography
Brutsche was born in Philadelphia, Pennsylvania, in 1846. He enlisted into the United States Navy. He died on 27 December 1880, and his remains are interred at the Lawnview Memorial Park in Rockledge, Pennsylvania.

Medal of Honor citation

See also

List of American Civil War Medal of Honor recipients: A–F

References

External links

1846 births
1880 deaths
People of Pennsylvania in the American Civil War
Union Navy officers
United States Navy Medal of Honor recipients
American Civil War recipients of the Medal of Honor
Military personnel from Philadelphia
Burials at Lawnview Memorial Park